Capel Vale Wines (often referred to simply as Capel Vale) is a privately owned Australian winery business based at Capel, in the Geographe wine region of Western Australia.

Established in 1974, the business operates a winery, two vineyards, a cellar door, and a restaurant at Capel, and also has three other vineyards, in the Great Southern, Margaret River and Pemberton wine regions, respectively.

See also

 Australian wine
 List of wineries in Western Australia
 Western Australian wine

References

Notes

Bibliography

External links
Capel Vale Wines – official site
Capel Vale Wine Shop – official online wine shop for Capel Vale

Wineries in Western Australia
South West (Western Australia)
Food and drink companies established in 1974
Australian companies established in 1974